Central Catonsville and Summit Park Historic District is a national historic district in Catonsville, Baltimore County, Maryland, United States. It is entirely residential and consists generally of rectangular lots, the largest lots being found on Frederick Road and Newburg Avenue. These contain the earliest dwellings. The earliest, and the largest house in the district is the Gary Mansion, known as The Summit, built in the 1850s as a summer house in Second Empire style. The Summit Park subdivision takes its name from this house, and surrounds it on all sides.  Structures in the district date from 1869 and extends to 1958, by which date the neighborhood had substantially achieved its present form and appearance.

It was added to the National Register of Historic Places in 2006.

References

External links
, at Maryland Historical Trust
Boundary Map of the Central Catonsville and Summit Park Historic District, Baltimore County, at Maryland Historical Trust

Catonsville, Maryland
Historic districts in Baltimore County, Maryland
Historic districts on the National Register of Historic Places in Maryland
National Register of Historic Places in Baltimore County, Maryland